Sahibabad Junction railway station is a railway station in Ghaziabad district, Uttar Pradesh, India. Its code is SBB. It serves Sahibabad city. The station has five platforms.

Sahibabad is a junction station because the railway line on one side splits in two: one line connects to New Delhi railway station via Anand Vihar railway station and the other line to Delhi junction via Delhi Shahdara. The other side line connects with Ghaziabad Junction railway station.

Trains 

 Chhattisgarh Express
 Bandra Terminus–Dehradun Express
 Bareilly–New Delhi Intercity Express
 Corbett Park Link Express
 Farakka Express (via Faizabad)
 Farakka Express (via Sultanpur)
 Ranikhet Express
 Satyagrah Express
 Unchahar Express
 Panchvalley Passenger

References

Railway stations in Ghaziabad district, India
Delhi railway division
Transport in Ghaziabad, Uttar Pradesh